The Folklore Museum of Velventos is a folk museum in Velventos, Western Macedonia. It is devoted to the folklore and domestic culture of the western Macedonia region of Greece in the recent pre-industrial past.

Foundation
The museum was established in late May 2006, under the direction of the Department of Art History and Museology at the Aristotle University of Thessaloniki. It was installed in a 19th century, Macedonian-style manor called the Konstas Mansion.

The building was upgraded under the Leader+ community initiative, including internal structural changes, electrical installations, furniture and equipment. The project involved the cooperation of local stakeholders, scientists and donors.

Exhibit
The folklore museum records pre-industrial life in rural Macedonia, in northern Greece. Exhibits show occupations like spinning, weaving, sewing, tailoring, shoemaking, wood cutting and carpentry. Objects in the collection range in size from a pin to a cauldron, and include prized possessions such as a baptismal dress and mundane objects such as stone handmill.

The arrangement of objects represents a compromise between the need to display the museum objects and the need to represent a typical home of the time, where bread was baked and cloth was woven. The lighting deliberately creates a theatrical atmosphere, particularly in the rooms that present "realism". Other exhibits, such as "From Earth to Wine" and "From Earth to Bread" are lit more neutrally, giving more of an outdoors effect.

Guided tours give visitors information on local history, daily life in the area, traditional professions, tools and local costumes.

Notes

References

Kozani (regional unit)
Folk museums in Western Macedonia